The Macau International Television Festival is an international television festival that takes place in Macau, China. It is jointly held by the Macau-Television-Media Association of Macau and China Television Artists Association. It is held in conjunction with the Macau International Movie Festival. Its main category is the Golden Lotus Awards.

Categories

Recurring
Best Television Drama / Outstanding Television Drama (最佳电视剧奖 / 优秀电视剧大奖)
Best Director (最佳导演奖)
Best Writing (最佳编剧奖) 
Best Actor (最佳男演员奖)
Best Actress (最佳女演员奖)
Best Supporting Actor (最佳男配角奖) 
Best Supporting Actress (最佳女配角奖)
Best Web Drama (优秀网络剧大奖) 
Best Television Producer (最佳电视制片人奖) 
Best Television Host (最佳电视节目主持人奖)
Best Variety Program (最佳电视综艺节目奖)

Non-recurring
Outstanding Producer (优秀制片人)
Director Artistic Outstanding Contribution Award (导演艺术杰出贡献奖)
Best Television OST Singer (最佳电视剧歌曲演唱大奖)
Best Animation (最佳动漫奖)
International Culture Contribution Award (国际文化贡献奖)
Best TV Special (最佳专题片大奖)
Best Documentary (最佳纪录片大奖)
China Television Film Industry Development Contribution Award (中国影视产业发展贡献奖)

Winners

2010

2012

2013

2014

2015

2016

References

External links

Golden Lotus Awards
Recurring events established in 2010
Chinese television awards
2010 establishments in China